Hollenstedt is a municipality in the district of Harburg, in Lower Saxony, Germany. It is situated approximately 25 km southwest of Hamburg, and 12 km south of Buxtehude.

Hollenstedt is also the seat of the Samtgemeinde ("collective municipality") Hollenstedt.

References

External links
 

Harburg (district)